Israel's Football Association (IFA; , HaHit'aḥdut leKaduregel beIsrael, literally "The Association of Football in Israel") is the governing body of football in Israel. It organizes a variety of association football leagues where the highest level is the Israeli Premier League; as well as national cups such as the Israel State Cup, the Toto Cup, and the Israel Super Cup; also, the Israel national football team. The IFA was founded in 1928 as the Palestine (Eretz Israel) Football Association and is based in the Tel Aviv District city of Ramat Gan, Israel. The Association is controversial due to its inclusion of clubs playing in Israeli settlements in the occupied West Bank (Judea and Samaria).

History
The Palestine Football Association (PFA) or Eretz Israel Football Association, was founded in a meeting held on 14 August 1928, and applied for membership of FIFA. It was admitted provisionally on 17 December 1928, affiliated on 17 May 1929 and recognised by FIFA's government on 6 July 1929. The PFA changed its name to the Israel Football Association (IFA) following the founding of the state of Israel in 1948.

The IFA was a member of the Asian Football Confederation (AFC) from 1954 until 1974, when it was expelled due to political pressure from Arab and Muslim members that refused to play against Israel. From then until 1992, the IFA was not affiliated with any confederation. During this period, the Israeli national teams played only in FIFA competitions and occasionally in OFC (Oceania), UEFA (Europe), and CONMEBOL (South America) qualifying tournaments.

In 1992, the IFA was admitted to UEFA as an associate member, becoming a full member two years later. Since 1992, Israeli clubs have played in the various UEFA club competitions, while the national teams have played in UEFA championships.

Controversy
As of 2017, the IFA included six member clubs playing in Israeli settlements in the West Bank. These are Maccabi Ariel indoor football club and Ariel municipal football club in Ariel; Beitar Givat Ze’ev Shabi in Giv'at Ze'ev, a settlement near Ramallah; Beitar Ma’aleh Adomim in Ma'ale Adumim, a settlement near East Jerusalem; Hapo’el Oranit in Oranit; and Hapo’el Jordan Valley in Tomer, a settlement built on land seized from the Palestinian village of Fasayil. A seventh club, Hapo’el Katamon Yerushalayim, plays some home games in the settlement of Ma'ale Adumim while two other clubs playing in Israel list offices in settlements near Hebron and Ramallah. Sari Bashi, Israel and Palestine advocacy director for Human Rights Watch, argues that the IFA is in violation of FIFA rules forbidding a club of one national association from playing in the territory of another as the West Bank is covered by the Palestinian Football Association, a FIFA member. Bashi also notes that Palestinians are not allowed to enter settlements to watch games played by these clubs.

German sportswear company Adidas previously sponsored the IFA, leading to criticism for supporting settlement clubs. More than 130 Palestinian sports clubs signed an open letter calling for Adidas to end its sponsorship of the IFA. An online petition of the BDS Movement to "Tell Adidas to end sponsorship of Israeli settlement teams" reportedly received more than 16,000 signatures. In June 2018, a Dutch BDS group delivered the open letter and petition to an Adidas office in Amsterdam. In July 2018, Adidas ended its sponsorship deal but was replaced as sponsor by Puma, another German sportswear company. As a result, Puma has become a BDS target with critics arguing that Puma, the IFA's only international sponsor, "is involved in violations of international law and human rights." Aya Khattab, a player on the Palestinian National Women's football team, argued that "Puma's sponsorship of the IFA, and the international legitimacy that it grants, signal to Israel's racist far-right regime that its expansion of illegal settlements by pushing Palestinian families off their ancestral lands can continue with impunity." Mahmoud Sarsak, a Palestinian football player who was imprisoned by Israel for several years without charge or trial, accused Puma of "supporting the hate which is destroying lives and poisoning the beautiful game" of football. In addition to Khattab and Sarsak, more than 200 Palestinian athletes and sports clubs have called for a Puma boycott, according to articles in the Electronic Intifada and Mondoweiss. In October 2019, posters calling for a boycott of Puma appeared on trains in London. The posters were removed by Transport for London, which described them as an unauthorized act of vandalism. In 2020, Universiti Teknologi MARA, the largest university in Malaysia, ended a sponsorship deal with Puma for their football team due to Puma's IFA sponsorship.

StandWithUs, a Israel advocacy group in the US, criticized calls for a boycott stating that "Sports are supposed to unite and bring people together, BDS drives them apart."

Awards and recognition
In 1979, Yosef Yekutieli, the founder of the IFA, was awarded the Israel Prize "for dedicating his life to promoting and laying the international foundation of Israeli sports."

See also
List of football stadiums in Israel
Sport in Israel

References

External links

 Israel at FIFA site
 Israel at UEFA site

Israel
Football in Israel
Futsal in Israel
Football
Sports organizations established in 1928
1928 establishments in Mandatory Palestine